Future Friends is the debut studio album by American musical duo Superfruit.  It was released on September 15, 2017 through RCA Records. The album is the latter release in the duo's Future Friends series that includes two extended plays, one released on June 30, 2017, and another released concurrently with the album. The album serves as a compilation album, containing the entire contents of both of the extended plays, a bonus track, and an additional remix not seen on either of the other releases. The song 'GUY.exe'  from the album went viral on TikTok as a challenge where people would show off their fit and muscular bodies.

Track listing

Charts

References

2017 debut albums
RCA Records albums
Albums produced by Sophie (musician)
Albums produced by Danny L Harle